Skuhrov nad Bělou is a municipality and village in Rychnov nad Kněžnou District in the Hradec Králové Region of the Czech Republic. it has about 1,100 inhabitants.

Administrative parts
Villages of Brocná, Debřece, Hraštice, Nová Ves, Rybníčky and Svinná are administrative parts of Skuhrov nad Bělou.

History
The first written mention of Skuhrov nad Bělou is from 1279. In 1310, it became a market town, but after the Thirty Years' War, it was depopulated and lost its importance.

Gallery

References

Villages in Rychnov nad Kněžnou District